Manchu Vishnu Vardhan Babu (born 23 November 1982) is an Indian actor and producer known for his works in Telugu cinema and television. Manchu had a brief stint as a child artist with the 1985 film Ragile Gundelu. Years later, he starred in the 2003 Telugu action film Vishnu, for which he won the Filmfare Best Male Debut. 
He is the co-owner of the film production house 24 Frames Factory and is an educationalist through Sree Vidyanikethan Educational Trust, founded by his father and veteran Telugu actor Mohan Babu. He is a founder and chairman of New York Academy, a school in Hyderabad for which his wife, Viranica, is the director and his father Mohan Babu, is the chair person. He is also the chairman of Spring Board Academy and Spring Board International Preschools which has more than 75 branches spread across Andhra Pradesh, Telangana, Tamil Nadu and Karnataka. Vishnu Manchu is the pro-chancellor for the prestigious Mohan Babu University in Tirupati established in 2022 by his legendary father Dr. M. Mohan Babu.

In 2007, he starred in the comedy film Dhee, which became a hit, and Manchu established his career in Telugu cinema. Manchu is one of the sponsors of the Celebrity Cricket League Telugu Warriors. Vishnu had been recently elected as the president of Movie Artists Association.

Early life
Manchu Vishnu Vardhan Babu was born in Madras, Tamil Nadu, India (present-day Chennai) to actor Mohan Babu and mother, late Vidya Devi. He grew up with his brother Manoj and sister Lakshmi.

After completing schooling from the Padmaseshadri Bala Bhavan School, Manchu went on to take an engineering degree from Sree Vidyanikethan Engineering College, majoring in Computer Sciences and Information Technology. During that time, he represented the Bhaskar JNTU cricket team, and also captained the university basketball team.

Career

1985; 2003–2006: Early work 
Manchu made his acting debut as a child artist in his father Mohan Babu's 1985 film Ragile Gundelu.

He landed his first lead role in the film Vishnu (2003) directed by Shaji Kailas, for which he won the Filmfare Best Male Debut. He played a guy who wants to win his childhood love with his own merits against many hurdles. The following year, he was seen in the film Suryam (2004) in which he played a guy who aims to fulfill the last wish of his mother. Manchu made a cameo appearance as a dancer in Political Rowdy (2005), a romantic action drama. 

He next appeared in the action-drama Astram (2006), as an IPS officer who has been appointed to finish off the ultras. Soon after, Manchu was cast in Game (2006), as Vijay Raj, sharing screen space with his celebrity father Mohan Babu and yesteryear heroine Shobana.

He finally got his critical breakthrough with the movie Dhee, alongside Genelia D'Souza. Released in 2007, Dhee became his first commercially successful film. It was remade in Tamil as Mirattal, in Bengali as Khokababu and in Oriya as Tu mo girlfriend. Manchu plunged into the limelight with this role.

2008–present: Career fluctuations
He then appeared in the 2008 film Krishnarjuna, the 2009 film Saleem and the 2011 film Vastadu Naa Raju. In 2012, comedy film Dhenikaina Ready got him critical success; the film grossed 200 million at the box office. He then appeared in Doosukeltha, directed by Veeru Potla, he starred opposite Lavanya Tripathi, the film grossed 126.3 million on its first week at the box office. He then appeared along with his father, in the critically acclaimed crime film Rowdy, written and directed by Ram Gopal Varma.

Manchu starred in G. Nageswara Reddy's Denikaina Ready, which became a hit and succeeded in changing his image. The next year, he had an opportunity to exhibit his versatility as an actor in the titular role of Veeru Potla's rom-com, Doosukeltha. The movie not only established Manchu as an actor, but also grossed more than 15 crore at the box office. His next project fared much better, when he played the Gambler Gopi in the ensemble comedy Pandavulu Pandavulu Tummeda (2014), which featured an ensemble cast of Manchu Manoj, Mohan Babu, Raveena Tandon, Hansika Motwani, Pranitha Subhash, and Varun Sandesh.

Manchu then played the role Krishna in Rowdy (2014) alongside his father Mohan Babu. Showing his range as an actor, Manchu later portrayed DCP Goutham in the commercially unsuccessful but critically adored film Anukshanam (2014), helmed by Ram Gopal Varma. He continued as a dramatic actor in the 2014 Erra Bus, produced and directed by Dasari Narayana Rao. He then appeared in the action thriller Dynamite, directed by Deva Katta. Though they made an interesting movie along the way, they paid for it at the box office. Manchu further proved his comedic talents with the romantic comedy entertainer Eedo Rakam Aado Rakam (2015), in which he co-starred with Raj Tarun. The same year, he completed filming for Saradaa but the film remains unreleased. In 2017, he starred in Luckunnodu, which performed poorly at the box office. By the end of 2017, he had already appeared in 20 films.

His film in 2018 include the crime drama Gayatri, in which Shriya Saran and his father Mohan Babu play other important characters and the comedy film Achari America Yatra; and the political thriller Voter 2019. His next film, Mosagallu (2021), is a crossover film directed by American filmmaker Jeffrey Gee Chin based on the world's biggest IT Scam, filmed in India and USA. It features Kajal Aggarwal, Suniel Shetty, Navdeep, Naveen Chandra and Ruhi Singh apart from Manchu. It was released in March 2021 and was an all time epic disaster at the box office not even being able to recover 1% of its budget.

In October 2021, he contested and won the elections of Movie Artists Association (MAA) as its president against Prakash Raj. Vishnu made the announcement about his next project titled 'Ginna' is being produced by Ava Entertainment and 24 Frames Factory which was initially planned to release in August but later released in October 2022 due to production delays.The film which was made on a budget of 20-25 crores managed to collect only 2 crores at the boxoffice and proved as a disaster.

Personal life 
In 2009, Manchu married Viranica Reddy, niece of the Y. S. Rajasekhara Reddy, the then chief minister of Andhra Pradesh. In 2011, they had twin daughters. In January 2018, they had a son and in August 2019, they had a daughter.

While filming the light-hearted comedy Achari America Yatra (2018), Manchu had a near-fatal experience on the set. The actor, who was shooting in Malaysia, suffered serious injuries when he hit his opponent with a helmet during a bike stunt scene and lost balance of his vehicle forcing him to hit the ground hard.

Filmography

As producer 
Siva Shankar (2003; presenter)
Current Theega (2014)
 Singam 123 (2015; also writer)
 Mama Manchu Alludu Kanchu (2015)
Chadarangam (2020; Zee5 web series)
 Son Of India (2022)

Other work

Television
Manchu made his foray into television by directing the 100th episode of Zee Telugu's series Happy Days. The episode achieved the highest TRP ratings among the 700 episodes of the series. Happy Days is also produced by 24 Frames Factory. He has also directed Lakshmi Talk Show or Premathoo Mee Lakshmi.

Producer
Manchu heads the 24 Frames Factory production house which in 2014 produced Pandavulu Pandavulu Tummeda, a comedy film with an ensemble cast. He also heads ThinkSmart, which handles post-production including graphics and other elements for cinema. Atanokkade, from ThinkSmart, won the best video effects award.

Educationist

Manchu is the director of Spring Board International Preschools. When he joined with the Sree Vidyanikethan Educational Trust set up by his father, it was already a well-established educational institution. He took charge of this institution and built them into model institutions offering value-based education to the students. He expanded and diversified it into Spring Board Academy, and became founder and chairman at the New York Academy.

Manchu runs the Sree Vidyanikethan Educational Trust, founded by his father. The trust runs the Sree Vidyanikethan International School, Sree Vidyanikethan Degree College, Sree Vidyanikethan Engineering College, Sree Vidyanikethan College of Pharmacy, Sree Vidyanikethan College of Nursing, the Sree Vidyanikethan Institute of Management and the Sree Vidyanikethan College for Post Graduation Studies.

Apart from an actor of repute, Vishnu Manchu is the pro-chancellor of the most reputed Mohan Babu University(MBU) at Tirupati, founded in 2022 by his legendary father Dr. M. Mohan Babu.

Army Green
Manchu started a social unit called Army Green for promoting environmental awareness. It adopted small settlements in the vicinity of the Sree Vidyanikethan Institutions.

Vishnu Manchu Art Foundation
Manchu set up an art foundation in Tirupati, the Vishnu Manchu Art Foundation (VMAF). Known as an institution established for the benefit and use of contemporary and gifted artists, the foundation provides a much-needed space free from any financial and commercial constraints. The main aim of the VMAF is to provide help to aspiring and talented artists to evolve the reach of their creativity. VMAF conducts a series of Make Art, Show Art and Beyond Art programmes each year.

As an art educational institution, Vishnu Manchu Art Foundation regularly hosts lectures and discussions on issues relating to the contemporary arts and artists. VMAF is a venue for art lovers and the artistic community to engage in spirited conversations with art critics and renowned academics who showcase their work at the foundation. VMAF is known for its traditional works and injection of new creative ideas and expressions.

References

External links

 
 

Living people
1982 births
Filmfare Awards South winners
Male actors in Telugu cinema
21st-century Indian male actors
People from Chittoor district
Male actors from Andhra Pradesh
People from Rayalaseema
Telugu male actors
Telugu film producers
Indian film producers
Indian television directors